Anita Guha (17 January 1932 – 20 June 2007) was an Indian actress who usually played mythological characters in films. She became known for playing the title role in Jai Santoshi Maa (1975). Previously, she had played Sita in other mythological films; Sampoorna Ramayana (1961), Shree Ram Bharat Milap (1965) and Tulsi Vivah (1971). Besides this, she also played notable roles in films such as Goonj Uthi Shehnai (1959), Purnima (1965), Pyar Ki Rahen (1959), Gateway of India (1957), Dekh Kabira Roya (1957), Lukochuri (1958) and Sanjog (1961).

Career
She came to Mumbai in the 1950s as a beauty pageant contestant when she was 15 years old. She became an actress there and made her film debut in Tonga-wali (1955). She moved on to hit films such as Dekh Kabira Roya (1957), Sharada (1957), and Goonj Uthi Shehnai, for which she earned nomination in Filmfare Award for Best Supporting Actress category, the  only nomination of her career. In 1961, she appeared as Sita, in Babubhai Mistry's Sampoorna Ramayana, which made her a household name.

But it was her title role in Jai Santoshi Maa (1975) that brought her the most fame. She had never even heard of goddess Santoshi until she was offered the role, as this was a little-known goddess. It was only a guest appearance, and her scenes were shot in 10–12 days. She fasted during the shooting. The low-budget pic was a surprise hit, and broke box office records while becoming a cultural phenomenon.  The goddess Santoshi now became a famous goddess, and women all over India worshipped her. People treated the movie theatres showing Jai Santoshi Maa as a temple, bringing offerings of food, leaving slippers at the door. Guha claimed that people came to her asking her to bless them, as they perceived her to be a real goddess.  However, she never became a devotee of the goddess herself, claiming that she was a devotee of the goddess Kali.

Other mythological films she acted in include  Kavi Kalidas (1959), Jai Dwarkadesh (1977) and Krishna Krishna (1986). She wasn't happy that she became typecast as a mythological actress, because acting offers eventually stopped coming her way. Her earlier credits include period films such as  Sangeet Samrat Tansen (1962), Kan Kan Mein Bhagwan (1963) and Veer Bhimsen (1964). She played Rajesh Khanna's adoptive mother in the huge hit Aradhana (1969).

Personal life
She was married to actor Manik Dutt; they had no biological children. They adopted a girl child later . After her husband's death, she lived alone in Mumbai where she died of cardiac failure on 20 June 2007.
Anita Guha is the maternal aunt of actor Prema Narayan. Prema is the daughter of her sister Anuradha Guha.

Filmography

Awards and nominations
 1960: Filmfare Award
 Filmfare Award for Best Supporting Actress: Goonj Uthi Shehnai: Nominated

References

External links
 

Indian film actresses
Actresses in Hindi cinema
Actresses from Mumbai
1932 births
2007 deaths
Place of birth missing
20th-century Indian actresses
Bengali actresses